Larabee may refer to:

 Larabee, California, United States
 Larabee, Louisiana, United States
 Agent Larabee, a character in the TV show Get Smart played by Robert Karvelas

See also
 Larrabee (disambiguation)
 Larabie (disambiguation)